The 1969 Grantland Rice Bowl was an NCAA College Division game following the 1969 season, between the East Tennessee State Buccaneers and the Louisiana Tech Bulldogs. This was the first 
time that the Grantland Rice Bowl was played in Baton Rouge, Louisiana – prior games had been played in Murfreesboro, Tennessee.

Notable participants
Louisiana Tech quarterback Terry Bradshaw was selected first in the 1970 NFL Draft by the Pittsburgh Steelers. His teammates Larry Brewer and Tommy Spinks were also drafted. Bradshaw and Spinks are inductees of their university's athletic hall of fame, as is head coach Maxie Lambright. Bradshaw is an inductee of both the College Football Hall of Fame and the Pro Football Hall of Fame.

Wide receiver Pat Hauser of East Tennessee State was also selected in the 1970 NFL Draft. Inductees of the university's athletics hall of fame include Hauser, defensive back Bill Casey, quarterback Larry Graham, and head coach John Robert Bell.

Scoring summary

Statistics

References

External links
 1969 Grantland Rice Bowl memories with ETSU players (video)
 Members of 1969 team look back at Grantland Rice Bowl victory
 Tales of the University

1969 NCAA College Division football season
Grantland Rice Bowl
East Tennessee State Buccaneers football bowl games
Louisiana Tech Bulldogs football bowl games
December 1969 sports events in the United States
Grantland Rice